Upper Beech Hill Brook is a river in Delaware County, New York. It flows into Beaver Kill northeast of Lewbeach.

References

Rivers of New York (state)
Rivers of Delaware County, New York
Rivers of Ulster County, New York